Kaleb is a given name, a variant spelling of Caleb, as well as a surname.

Notable people with the given name "Kaleb" include

Kaleb Canales (born 1978), American basketball coach
Kaleb Cowart (born 1992), American baseball player
Kaleb Eleby (born 2000), American football player
Kaleb Eulls (born 1991), American football player
Kaleb Ramot Gemilang (born 1991), Indonesian basketball player
Kaleb Jackson (born 1996), American soccer player
Kaleb Konley (born 1983), American professional wrestler
Kaleb McGary (born 1995), American football player
Kaleb Nation (born 1988), American author
Kaleb Ngatoa (born 2001), New Zealand racing driver
Kaleb Nobles (born 1993/1994), American football coach
Kaleb Nytrøen (1905–1994), Norwegian police officer
Kaleb Ort (born 1992), American baseball player
Kaleb Ramsey (born 1989), American football player
Kaleb Stewart (1975–2021), American musician
Kaleb Tarczewski (born 1993), American basketball player
Kaleb Tedla (1918–2006), Eritrean businessman
Kaleb Toth (born 1977), Canadian lacrosse player
Kaleb Trask (born 1999), New Zealand rugby union footballer
Kaleb Weis (born 1983/1984), American politician
Kaleb Wesson (born 1999), American basketball player

Notable people with the surname "Kaleb" include
Ante Kaleb (born 1993), Croatian handball player
Antonija Kaleb (born 1986), Croatian volleyball player
Darius Kaleb, American actor
Nikša Kaleb (born 1973), Croatian handball player
Vjekoslav Kaleb (1905–1996), Croatian writer

See also
Caleb (given name), a page for people with the given name "Caleb"
Kalib, a disambiguation page for "Kalib"